The 2015 Cedar Rapids Titans season was the fourth season of the Cedar Rapids Titans as a professional indoor football franchise in the Indoor Football League (IFL). One of ten teams competing in the IFL for the 2014 season, the Cedar Rapids Titans are members of the league's United Conference

The Titans play their home games at the U.S. Cellular Center in downtown Cedar Rapids, Iowa. The team is led by head coach Mark Stoute, the 2013 Indoor Football League Coach of the Year. The Titans Dolls dance squad is led by dance team director Lindsay Wray.

The Titans were tasked with replacing 2014 starting quarterback Spencer Ohm, while also losing the IFL's leading rusher, LaRon Council. The team signed Sam Durley, from the defunct Wyoming Cavalry to be their new starting quarterback. Durley got the Titans off to a 6-3 start, good enough for second place in the United Conference, but he was released on May 4, 2015 to sign with the New Orleans VooDoo. However, just two weeks prior to Durley's release, the Titans had traded for the 2014 IFL MVP, Willie Copeland.

Schedule
Key:

Regular season
All start times are local time

Standings

Postseason

Roster

References

External links
Cedar Rapids Titans official website
Cedar Rapids Titans official statistics
Cedar Rapids Titans at The Gazette

Cedar Rapids
Cedar Rapids River Kings
Cedar Rapids Titans